Zakharov is a rural locality (a khutor) and the administrative center of Zakharovskoye Rural Settlement, Kotelnikovsky District, Volgograd Oblast, Russia. The population was 489 as of 2010. There are 14 streets.

Geography 
Zakharov is located on the right bank of the Aksay Yesaulovsky, 8 km northwest of Kotelnikovo (the district's administrative centre) by road. Kotelnikovo is the nearest rural locality.

References 

Rural localities in Kotelnikovsky District